The 1988 Grand Prix de Tennis de Toulouse was a men's tennis tournament played on indoor carpet courts in Toulouse, France that was part of the Regular Series of the 1988 Grand Prix tennis circuit. It was the seventh edition of the tournament and was held from 10 October until 16 October 1988. Second-seeded Jimmy Connors won the singles title.

Finals

Singles

 Jimmy Connors defeated  Andrei Chesnokov, 6–2, 6–0
 It was Connors' 2nd singles title of the year and the 107th of his career.

Doubles

 Tom Nijssen /  Ricki Osterthun defeated.  Mansour Bahrami /  Guy Forget, 6–3, 6–4.

References

External links
 ITF tournament edition details

Grand Prix de Tennis de Toulouse
Grand Prix de Tennis de Toulouse
Grand Prix de Tennis de Toulouse
Grand Prix de Tennis de Toulouse